Nolann Le Garrec (born 14 May 2002) is a French rugby union player. He currently plays as a scrum-half for Racing 92 in the Top 14.

Coming from Morbihan, he began his career with Vannes before moving to Racing 92 in 2017.

Career
Nolann Le Garrec was called by Fabien Galthié to the French national team for the first time in June 2022, for the summer tour of Japan.

References

External links
 Racing 92
 EPCR
 All.Rugby
 It's Rugby

French rugby union players
Rugby union scrum-halves
Racing 92 players
Rugby Club Vannes players
Sportspeople from Vannes
Living people
2002 births